Jiang Yu (born 1964) is the current Chinese ambassadress to Romania since 2019. From 2006 to 2012 she was also Spokesperson of the Ministry of Foreign Affairs of the People's Republic of China.

Biography 
A native of Beijing, she has been working for the Ministry of Foreign Affairs for over twenty years and she had been posted around the world, including the United Nations Headquarters in New York City and the Xinhua News Agency in Hong Kong.

Over the years, she has become noted for her sharp commentary. In March 2011, her comments regarding the handling of journalists operating in mainland China in the wake of growing social unease about restricted civil liberties in the mainland attracted some attention.

Positions held
1987-1991: Staff Member of Beijing Personnel Service Corporation for Diplomatic Missions

From 1991 to 1992 she was Staff Member, Attaché, Information Department of the Ministry of Foreign Affairs of the People's Republic of China.

1992-1995: Attaché, Third Secretary, Chinese Permanent Mission to the UN, New York

1995-2002: Third Secretary, Deputy Director and Director, Information Department, MFA

2002-2005: Counsellor, Office of the Commissioner of MFA in Hong Kong

2005-2006: Counsellor, Information Department, MFA

From 2006 to 2012 she was Deputy Director-General of the Information Department, MFA to this post belongs the office as spokesperson of the  Ministry of Foreign Affairs of the People's Republic of China.
From 2012 to 2015 she was Deity Correspondent of the Office of the Commissioner of the Ministry of Foreign Affairs of the People's Republic of China in the Hong Kong Special Administrative Region.
From 2015 to 2019 she was ambassadress in Tirana.
2019-incumbent, she was ambassador to Romania.

References

External links
Jiang Yu's first Press Conference

Chinese women ambassadors
Living people
1964 births
People's Republic of China politicians from Beijing
Chinese expatriates in the United States
Ministry of Foreign Affairs of the People's Republic of China officials
Ambassadors of China to Albania